Red Wine is a 2013 Indian Malayalam-language thriller film directed by Salam Bappu and written by Mammen K. Rajan from a story by Noufal Blathoor. It stars Mohanlal, Fahad Fazil, and Asif Ali. The film's soundtrack and background score were composed by Bijibal. Red Wine was released on 21 March 2013. The film was later dubbed into Telugu under the same title.

Plot

ACP Ratheesh Vasudevan IPS, a brilliant and experienced police officer, is appointed to investigate the murder case of Anoop C V, a part-time actor in local plays. He is assisted by Sub-Inspector Rafi. 
During the initial stages of the investigation, Ratheesh learns from Anoop's family members, neighbours and from Anoop's close friend Joe Sebastin that Anoop was a brilliant student both in school and college and that also that he was the Local Committee Secretary of the Leftist Party and opted for helping the local population rather than using his engineering degree to get a well-paying job abroad  .  Joe Sebastian is running a catering service and is also a quarry owner. K P Ramesh Kumar is a young man who is employed in a private firm and he is in debt. Ramesh has a wife and a newborn child and he is struggling to make ends meet. Navas Paramban is a friend of Anoop who owns an advertisement company.
 
Narayanan is a man who is Anoop's close friend and mentor, who had known Anoop right from his childhood since Narayanan had enrolled Anoop in school when Anoop was a kid and who influenced him to read a lot. During the investigation and through various people he met, Ratheesh comes across a suspicious private bank CAPITAL FINCORP which was situated in the heart of the city . Later he gets to know more about the bank from Navas and Abhilash who is a clerk at the bank. One day, before leaving the village to set off for a short journey, Narayanettan comes to meet Ratheesh at his office and tells more about Anoop and also the things he did for the welfare and betterment of the common people. Narayanan also told that a few days before Anoop's death, Anoop had filed a petition with the tribals in Wayanad to the RDO about a land encroachment attempt by the private bank, which could result in the life of tribals being evicted from there . The bankers had planned to construct an ayurvedic resort in that area. Naryanan doubted whether Anoop's murder was a political murder . Later Ratheesh meets the RDO Ann Mary and inquires about the whereabouts of the petition . She replied that she had forwarded it to the Land Acquisition section head Rathnakaran Pillai for immediate action after knowing the seriousness of the situation. She also said that Rathnakaran was on sick leave for many days and that the files were with him. Later Ratheesh found out that Pillai was corrupt and had given the files to the manager of CAPITAL FINCORP. Pillai is eventually arrested from his flat by Ratheesh and his team. Later one day during a casual talk with Ann Mary at her home,she revealed to Ratheesh that Anoop was her Facebook friend and also revealed that Anoop was in love with his fiancé Jasmine . On further investigation Ratheesh found out that Ramesh Kumar was a suspect in the crime after Abhilash gives Ramesh's non-liability certificate from the bank to Ratheesh. Later, lookout notices for Ramesh were put up around the main cities.

After gathering clear and concrete evidence, Ratheesh formally arrests the bank manager Venugopal, the regional head Philipose Koshy and their henchman Shibumon. On questioning them, they admit and confess their crimes that they were behind it and also that Ramesh was the murderer. The commissioner asks Ratheesh to speed up the investigation since it was an unusual murder case and that he is having a lot of pressure from the top brasses in the police department. On questioning Philipose and Venu again, Ratheesh found out that Dr Paul Alexander, who is a rich businessman is also involved in the act under the pretext of a charitable trust named Karunya Charitable Trust. Ratheesh later arrests Paul from the Baby Memorial Hospital at Calicut where he was undergoing treatment.

Ratheesh and his police team had properly planned to nab Ramesh to produce him in the court along with the other culprits the next day. That night, Ramesh reached his residence. Then quickly the police team who were hiding nearby jumped out from nowhere and began chasing him. While chasing Ramesh, he gets hit by a passing truck, thrown onto a passing car and dies. Finally, Ratheesh goes to the mortuary to see Ramesh's frozen corpse for the last time. While coming out of the mortuary, he find's Ramesh's wife Deepthi and their infant sitting inside an autorickshaw. The movie ends as Ratheesh leaves in his jeep, speechless with a heavy heart. In the final credits scene, Ratheesh is seen spending his time at a lonely seashore.

Cast

Production
The film was shot on locations in Kozhikode and Wayanad. The film began its shoot and held its pooja on 30 November 2012.

The film's first teaser was released on 22 December 2012, and a theatrical trailer was released on 5 March 2013. A promotional song was released on 18 March 2013.

Release and reception
Red Wine received mixed to positive reviews from film critics.

 Aswin of The Times of India says that "Red Wine makes it too easy, too effortless and the thin element of suspense wanes no sooner than it even appears".
 Sify.com rated the film as "above Average", stating that "Red Wine is not bad, but it is not great either. If you are not looking forward to some modern pattern, the film may be a fine option as well".
 Paresh of Rediff.com says that "Red Wine is worth watching for its approach and its lead actors".
 Nirmal of One India says that "Red Wine is an interesting film by the 'super combo' of Mohanlal, Fahad Fazal and Asif Ali, a routine murder mystery, but a watchable one".
 Indiaglitz.com says that "Red Wine is a clean bit of film which can definitely be prescribed for families. One time watch for others though it is quite predictable to the core".

Soundtrack

The film's soundtrack and background score were composed by Bijibal, with lyrics penned by Rafeeq Ahammed and Santhosh Varma. The album was launched on 7 March 2013 at Crown Plaza in Kochi. The event was attended by Mohanlal, Asif Ali, Saiju Kurup, Meera Nandan, Miya, Anusree, Maria John and other personalities from the film industry, along with the technical crew and cast of the film. The audio rights were acquired by Mathrubhumi Music.

References

External links
 Official website
 

2013 films
2010s Malayalam-language films
Films shot in Kerala
Films shot in Kozhikode
2013 directorial debut films